Lazarus Saturday in Eastern Christianity (consisting of the Eastern Orthodox and Oriental Orthodox Churches) refers to the moveable feast before Palm Sunday to which it is liturgically linked. It celebrates the raising of Lazarus of Bethany.  Bethany is recorded in the New Testament as a small village in Judaea, the home of the siblings Mary of Bethany, Martha, and Lazarus, as well as that of Simon the Leper.

John's gospel reports that "Six days before the Passover, Jesus came to Bethany, where Lazarus lived, whom Jesus had raised from the dead."  Presumably, it is where he spent the Great Sabbath that occurs immediately before Passover, prior to his triumphal entry into Jerusalem. Jesus is reported to have lodged there during Holy Week, and it is where his anointing by Lazarus' sister Mary took place a few days later on Holy Wednesday.

History
The antiquity of this commemoration is demonstrated by the homilies of St. John Chrysostom (349–407), St Augustine of Hippo Regia (354–430), and others. In the 7th and 8th centuries, special hymns and canons for the feast were written by St. Andrew of Crete, St. Cosmas of Maium and St. John Damascene, which are still sung to this day.

Liturgical aspects

Lazarus Saturday and Palm Sunday together hold a unique position in the church year, as days of joy and triumph interposed between the penitence of Great Lent and the mourning of Holy Week.

Divine services
During the preceding week the propers in the Lenten Triodion track the sickness and then the death of Lazarus, and Christ's journey from beyond Jordan to Bethany. This week is referred to as the "Week of Palms" or the "Flowery Week."

The position of Lazarus Saturday is summed up in the first sticheron chanted at vespers on Friday:

Having completed the forty days that bring profit to our soul, we beseech Thee in Thy love for man: Grant us also to behold the Holy Week of Thy Passion, that in it we may glorify Thy mighty acts and Thine ineffable dispensation for our sakes, singing with one mind: O Lord, glory to Thee.

During Friday vespers the reading of Genesis (which began on the first day of Great Lent) is concluded with the description of the death, burial and mourning of Jacob and on Friday night, at compline, a Canon on the Raising of Lazarus by Saint Andrew of Crete is sung; this is a rare full canon, having all nine canticles.

The scripture readings and hymns for this day focus on the raising of Lazarus as a foreshadowing of the Resurrection of Christ and a prefiguring of the General Resurrection. The Gospel narrative is interpreted in the hymns as illustrating the two natures of Christ: his humanity in asking, "Where have ye laid him?", and his divinity by commanding Lazarus to come forth from the dead. A number of the hymns, written in the first or second person, relate Lazarus' death, entombment and burial bonds symbolically to the individual's sinful state. Many of the resurrectional hymns of the normal Sunday service are sung while prayers for the departed, prescribed on Sundays, are permitted. During the divine liturgy, the baptismal hymn, "As many as have been baptized into Christ have put on Christ" replaces the Trisagion indicating that this had been a day on which baptisms were performed and in some churches nowadays adult converts are still baptized on this day.

Associated customs

Fasting
Although the forty days of Great Lent end on Lazarus Friday, this day is still observed as a fast day; however, the fast is mitigated to allow consumption of caviar, eggs being a symbol of the resurrection and prominent on Pascha, and fish eggs being a shadow thereof show the raising of Lazarus as a foreshadowing of Christ's Resurrection, as elucidated in the propers of the day.

Hermits
Lazarus Saturday is the day when, traditionally, hermits would leave their retreats in the wilderness to return to the monastery for the Holy Week services. In many places in the  Russian Church, the vestments and church hangings on this day ( or  Вербная суббота) and on Palm Sunday are green, denoting the renewal of life. In the Greek Church, it is customary on Lazarus Saturday to  plait elaborate crosses out of palm leaves which will be used on Palm Sunday.

Regional observances

Armenia
The Raising of Lazarus is also commemorated on this same Saturday according to the Church Calendar of the Armenian Apostolic Church.

Greece and Cyprus
Baking lazarakia to eat on Lazarus Saturday is a tradition practiced in Greece and Cyprus. It is said to have originated in Cyprus, and it is significant that St. Lazarus was their first bishop. The bread is a mildly sweet Lenten bread made with sweet-smelling spices that looks like Lazarus bound up in grave clothes.

Serbia and Bulgaria
The feast of Lazarus Saturday is commemorated by Serbian Orthodox and Bulgarian Orthodox tradition. Due to a general lack of palm trees, willow twigs branches are blessed, and distributed to the faithful. In Serbia, small bells are often tied to the branches. Other left-over traditions related (perhaps related to paganism) include:
Burning a fire against vermin and snakes
Picking flowers and herbs which are put in water to either drink or swim in
Lazarice ritual, a procession, parade of six maids

Notes

References

External links

Lazarus Saturday – Icon and Synaxarion
Samedi de Lazare – French translation of above article, with added material (Orthodoxwiki, homily, Icons)
Danas je Lazareva subota 

Lent
Byzantine Rite
Eastern Orthodox liturgical days
Holy Week
Greek traditions
Saturday observances
Oriental Orthodoxy
April observances
May observances
Serbian traditions
Bulgarian traditions
Slavic holidays
Holidays based on the date of Easter